Raymond Brown (born July 5, 1965 in Atlanta, Georgia) is a retired American basketball player.

He played collegiately for the University of Idaho.

He played for the Utah Jazz (1989–90) in the NBA for 16 games.

External links

1965 births
Living people
American expatriate basketball people in Argentina
American expatriate basketball people in France
American expatriate basketball people in Italy
American expatriate basketball people in Spain
American men's basketball players
Baloncesto Fuenlabrada players
Baloncesto León players
Basketball players from Atlanta
Idaho Vandals men's basketball players
Joventut Badalona players
Lega Basket Serie A players
Liga ACB players
Limoges CSP players
Rapid City Thrillers players
Small forwards
Undrafted National Basketball Association players
Utah Jazz players